Oscar Engler (29 January 1889 – ?) was a Swiss football player.

External links 
Interfc.it 

1889 births
Year of death missing
Swiss men's footballers
FC St. Gallen players
Torino F.C. players
Inter Milan players
Association football defenders